Filippo Boncompagni (7 September 1548 – 9 June 1586) was an Italian Cardinal, created by Pope Gregory XIII (his uncle) on 2 June 1572.

Biography 
Born at Bologna, he served as superintendent general of the Papal States (Cardinal-Nephew) during his pontificate (1572–85). He occupied several curial offices (grand penitentiary, prefect of the S.C. of the Tridentine Council). He participated in the papal conclave, 1585 as a leader of the cardinals created by Gregory XIII. He was buried in the Liberian Basilica, of which he was archpriest.

See also
Boncompagni

External links

1548 births
1586 deaths
Filippo
Clergy from Bologna
16th-century Italian cardinals
Cardinal-nephews
Members of the Sacred Congregation of the Council
Major Penitentiaries of the Apostolic Penitentiary